is a professional Japanese baseball player and a cricketer. He plays infielder for the Saitama Seibu Lions. He took up cricket with the Japan Cricket Association after going unsigned following his release by the Seibu Lions.

In September 2022, he was named in Japan's T20I squad for the 2022–23 ICC Men's T20 World Cup East Asia-Pacific Qualifier and their series against Indonesia. He made his T20I debut on 10 October 2022, against Indonesia.

References

External links

 NPB.com
 

1980 births
Living people
Baseball people from Osaka
Japanese baseball players
Japanese cricketers
Japan Twenty20 International cricketers
Nippon Professional Baseball infielders
Yokohama BayStars players
Hiroshima Toyo Carp players
Saitama Seibu Lions players